Elouera Beach or Elouera is a patrolled beach on Bate Bay, in Cronulla, New South Wales, Australia. The Wall is the local name given to the area between North Cronulla Beach and Elouera.

History
Elouera is an Aboriginal word meaning a pleasant place.

Elouera Surf Lifesaving Club
The Elouera Surf Lifesaving Club was established in 1966. On the official opening of the clubhouse on 8 June 1967, the club's first surf boat Charlotte Breen, donated by local businessman Tom Breen, was christened and launched. The Elouera "Sharks" had 375 members in the initial season.

Gallery

See also
 Beaches in Sydney
 Cronulla sand dunes, Kurnell Peninsula

References

Geography of Sydney
Surfing locations in New South Wales
Beaches of New South Wales
Cronulla, New South Wales